Lampertswalde is a municipality in the district of Meißen, in Saxony, Germany.

Municipality subdivisions
Lampertswalde includes the following subdivisions:
Adelsdorf (formerly Dorf der Jugend)
Blochwitz
Brockwitz
Brößnitz
Mühlbach
Oelsnitz
Niegeroda
Quersa
Schönborn
Weißig am Raschütz

References 

Meissen (district)